Beloit Airport,  is a privately owned public use airport located  east of the central business district of Beloit, a city in Rock County, Wisconsin, United States.

Although most airports in the United States use the same three-letter location identifier for the FAA and International Air Transport Association (IATA), this airport is assigned 44C by the FAA but has no designation from the IATA.

Facilities and aircraft 
It has one asphalt runway: 7/25 is 3,300 by 50 feet (1,006 x 15 m).

For the 12-month period ending June 9, 2022, the airport had 19,630 aircraft operations, an average of 54 per day; 99% general aviation, less than 1% air taxi and less than 1% military. In January 2023, there were 31 aircraft based at this airport: 25 single-engine, 3 multi-engine, 1 helicopter and 2 ultralight.

See also
 List of airports in Wisconsin

References

External links 

Airports in Wisconsin
Buildings and structures in Beloit, Wisconsin